Zorro in the Court of England is a 1969 Italian adventure film directed by Franco Montemurro.

Cast 

 Spiros Focás: Pedro Suarez / Zorro
 Dada Gallotti: Rosanna Gonzales 
 Franco Ressel: Lord Percy Moore 
 Massimo Carocci: Pedrito 
 Daniele Vargas: Sir Basil Ruthford 
 Barbara Carrol: Queen Victoria 
 Tullio Altamura: Manuel Garcia 
 Ignazio Balsamo: Dice gambler 
 Attilio Dottesio: Public prosecutor at Cortez trial 
 Franco Fantasia: Captain Wells

References

External links

1960 films
1960 Western (genre) films
1960s historical adventure films
Italian historical adventure films
Zorro films
Spaghetti Western films
Films set in England
Films set in the 19th century
Films scored by Angelo Francesco Lavagnino
1960s Italian-language films
1960s American films
1960s Italian films